Edwin James (Eddie) Beardmore  (1891–1985) was a politician in Queensland, Australia. He was a Member of the Queensland Legislative Assembly.

Politics
Beardmore was a member of the Balonne Shire Council for 15 years, being deputy chairman for 8 years.

A member of the Country Party, Beardmore was elected to the Queensland Legislative Assembly at the 1957 election in the electoral district of Balonne. He retained the seat at the 1960, 1963 and 1966 elections. In 1969, he was in a serious car accident and did not contest the election later that year, ending his political service.

References

Members of the Queensland Legislative Assembly
1891 births
1985 deaths
20th-century Australian politicians
National Party of Australia members of the Parliament of Queensland
Australian Members of the Order of the British Empire